Ashkal Alwan, The Lebanese Association for Plastic Arts is a non-profit organization that promotes contemporary art practices in Lebanon and the broader region.

History 
Ashkal Alwan was founded in 1993 by Lebanese curator Christine Tohmé. Since its establishment, the association has been committed to contemporary artistic practice, research, and modes of study. The association aims to facilitate artistic production, foster critical thinking around contemporary social realities, and engage in community mobilization.

Ashkal Alwan's mission is to create networks of exchange between artistic and cultural practitioners and institutions, build an archival record of artistic and intellectual endeavors in Lebanon and the region, support emerging and established artists by providing the necessary resources for the development of ideas and work, rethink art education, help enrich critical discourse in the Arabic language, as well as provide support for independent initiatives working in and around the civic and political realms.

Ashkal Alwan’s programs include Home Works, a multidisciplinary forum on cultural practices taking place every three years; Home Workspace Program, a tuition-free annual study program for emerging artists; Video Works, an annual video production grant, and a mentoring and screening platform; a Residency Program for artists and cultural practitioners; and the publication of literary works and artist books. Its educational and production platforms are accessible to the public. Facilities include auditoria, editing studios, performance spaces, a library featuring a unique collection on contemporary artistic, cultural, and textual practices in Lebanon and beyond, and an extensive audio-visual archive.

Public Programming, Workshops and Curated Projects 
2021
Open-year format of the 10th edition of the Home Workspace Program

2020
Perpetual Postponement, an online bilingual publication platform 
aashra, an online streaming platform 
2019
Home Works 8: A Forum on Cultural Practices, Beirut 
Digital Earth Symposium

2017
 Upon a Shifting Plate, an off-site project of the Sharjah Biennial 13, co-organized with the Sharjah Art Foundation
Video Works 2017

2016
Video Works 2016
 Symposium on the Arabic Novel
2015
Home Works 7
Video Works 2015
 The Arabic Language Today and Social Media (Symposium) 
2014
Video Works 2014

2013
Home Works 6
 Parallel Modernities: A Sweet Sixties Conference 
2012
 How Soon Is Now: A Tribute to Dreamers, an exhibition by Joana Hadjithomas and Khalil Joreige
2011
Video Works 2011

2010
Home Works 5

2009
 Video Works 2009

2008
Home Works IV

2007
 Video Avril
 Meeting Points 5 Festival
2006
 Most Probably I Will Be Performing this Dream Tonight (Group exhibition and performance festival) 
 Travelling Is Impossible: Harun, Kodwo and I (Film retrospective and symposium around the works of Harun Farocki and the Black Audio Film Collective)
2005
Home Works III

2004
 Laughter, in collaboration with LIFT (London International Festival of Theater)
 My Neck Is Thinner than a Hair, a presentation by the Atlas Group (Volumes 1-21)
2003
Home Works II
 Possible Narratives, as part of Videobrasil

2002
Home Works I

2001
 Audio Workshop with the British Council 
 Missing Links at the Townhouse Gallery in Cairo, Egypt
2000
Hamra Street Project
 Contemporary Art from Lebanon at the Borusan Sanat Gallery in Istanbul, Turkey

1999
Corniche Project

1997
 Sioufi Garden Project

1995
Sanayeh Garden Project

References

External links
 Website of Ashkal Alwan

Arts organisations based in Lebanon
Non-profit organisations based in Lebanon
Education in Beirut
Buildings and structures in Beirut
Art museums and galleries in Lebanon
1994 establishments in Asia